An altar cruet or mass cruet is a small jug used in mass to carry the water or wine that are used in the consecration. The current cruets have replaced the old amphoras that, with the name of hama or amula, were used to receive and carry the chalices of the wine that the faithful offered at Mass.  Often they were richly decorated metal jugs. Others were made of glass or clay. The reduced form of the present cruets dates, at least, from the 12th century.

Christian folklore
Eucharistic objects